Argentine Americans are Americans whose full or partial origin is in Argentina.

They are part of the broader Hispanic and Latino American category, and make up a scant 0.1% of the U.S. population, compared to larger Hispanic American groups such as Mexican American (11%) and Stateside Puerto Ricans (2%). Argentine immigration increased after the 1976 Argentine coup d'état, and many took up residence in states such as California, Florida, and New York.

History
In any case, it seems that the first Argentines who arrived in the United States did so during the 1950s and 1960s, seeking better economic conditions. A wave of Argentine immigrants came to Las Vegas, Nevada in the 1950s. Most these arrivals had achieved higher education in Argentina. For example, many were scientists. However, immigrants in the late 1970s arrived fleeing the political state sponsored terrorism of the dictatorship. They numbered 44,803 people. Then, a few decades later, large waves of immigrants left the country after its economic crash in 2001 and economic decline in 2014. As a result, according to "Latinx Immigrants" from the International and Cultural Psychology book series, as of 2018 there were over a million Argentines living abroad. Approximately 60% of Argentineans now living in the United States arrived after 1990. This influx in immigrants was especially dramatic between the years 2000 and 2005, with many hoping to escape financial loss in their home country.

This new immigrant group had an educational level lower than earlier immigrants. The majority of Argentine immigrants headed to metropolitan areas, especially New York City, where 20 percent of them lived in the 1970s. In the 1980s, that percentage increased to just over 23 percent, and the 1990 U.S. Census recorded that New York City had 17,363 Argentine Americans and Los Angeles, 15,115.
Immigration to New York City was popular because of the existing Argentine and Italian communities, as many Argentines are of Italian origin. With the goal of helping its Argentine population, the government of the city created several organizations such as the Argentine-American Chamber of Commerce, which that established relations between Argentina and the United States. The 1990 U.S. Census recorded 92,563 Argentines, evidencing that nearly half of the Argentine immigrants arrived in the last two decades alone.

After the 1990s, Southern California and Florida became leading destinations for new immigrants from Argentina. According to the 2010 Census, out of the over 200,000 Argentine Americans recorded, it is estimated that Los Angeles and Miami have over 50,000 Argentine Americans each, followed by the New York area. According to data from the Pew Research Center, in 2017 about 29% of Argintine Americans resided in Florida. Meanwhile, 18% lived in California and 10% in New York.

Socioeconomics 
The profile of the Argentine American population is generally similar to the overall U.S. population's. Among the key differences, however, is educational attainment. Argentine Americans exhibit a rate of 39.5% of holders of bachelor's, graduate, or professional degrees, contrasted with the 27.5% of the overall U.S. population. The difference is more marked among women: 40.2% for Argentine American females, and 26.7% for all U.S. females. Another major difference is that 69.1% of Argentine Americans are immigrants, which contrasts sharply with 12.6% of the overall U.S. population.

Demographics

States 
The 10 states with the largest population of Argentines (Source: 2010 Census):

  - 57,260 (0.3% of state population)
  - 44,410 (0.1% of state population)
  - 24,969 (0.1% of state population)
  - 14,272 (0.2% of state population)
  - 13,831 (0.1% of state population)
  - 6,263 (0.1% of state population)
  - 5,294 (less than 0.1% of state population)
  - 5,138 (0.1% of state population)
  - 4,639 (0.2% of state population)
  - 4,273 (less than 0.1% of state population)

Cities 
The 10 cities with the largest population of Argentines (Source: 2010 Census):

 New York, NY - 15,169 (0.2%)
 Los Angeles - 8,570 (0.2%)
 Miami, FL - 4,891 (1.2%)
 Miami Beach, FL - 4,030 (4.6%)
 Houston, TX - 2,440 (0.1%)
 Chicago, IL - 1,743 (0.1%)
 Hollywood, FL - 1,626 (1.2%)
 Aventura, FL - 1,579 (4.4%)
 San Diego, CA - 1,322 (0.1%)
 Pembroke Pines, FL - 1,147 (0.7%)

Ethnic background 

The ancestry of the majority of the population of Argentina is primarily of Italian and Spanish ancestry (see demographics of Argentina) with significant French, German, mulatto, mestizo, Slavic, and Semitic (Jewish and Arab) components. Minority have Amerindian ancestors (primarily Mapuche, Qulla, Wichí, and Toba), Chinese ancestors, Indian/Indo-Caribbean ancestors, and other European and Asian ancestors.

Large communities 
Only data for immigrant Argentine Americans are available. The twenty U.S. communities of 500 or more people which have the highest percentages of Argentine immigrants are:

Miami Beach, FL 4.4%
Sunny Isles Beach, FL 4.1%
Plantation Mobile Home Park, FL 4.0%
Bay Harbor Islands, FL 3.5%
North Bay Village, FL and Key Biscayne, FL 3.4%
Deer Park, CA 3.3%
Harbor Hills, NY 3.0%
Surfside, FL 2.6%
Lauderdale-by-the-Sea, FL 2.4%
Acton, CA 2.3%
Aventura, FL 2.1%
Islandia, NY and The Crossings, FL 2.0%
Thomaston, NY and Ojus, FL 1.9%
Doral, FL 1.8%
East Richmond Heights, CA 1.7%
Lebanon, IL 1.6%
Mayland-Pleasant Hill, TN 1.5%
Sunnyslope, CA, Herricks, NY, and La Habra Heights, CA 1.4%
Lawrenceville, NJ and Cutler, FL 1.3%
Gardiner, NY, Miami Shores, FL, Flower Hill, NY, and Groton Long Point, CT 1.2%

Notable people 

Argentine Americans have been notable in contemporary American lifestyle in cultural and intellectual aspects. Among the outstanding people are actresses Alexis Bledel and Anya Taylor-Joy, actor Lorenzo Lamas, journalist Andrés Oppenheimer, sportscaster Andrés Cantor, musicians Lalo Schifrin and Kevin Johansen, businessman Jorge M. Pérez, writer Fabian Nicieza and athletes Marcelo Balboa, Martin Gramatica, Pablo Mastroeni and Claudio Reyna. For a complete list of Argentinean American notable people, see List of Argentine Americans.

See also

Argentine Australians
Demographics of Argentina
White Latin Americans
White Hispanic and Latino Americans
Argentina–United States relations

References

Further reading
 Rodriguez, Julio. "Argentinean Americans." Gale Encyclopedia of Multicultural America, edited by Thomas Riggs, (3rd ed., vol. 1, Gale, 2014), pp. 141-150. online

External links 

American Blog (Spanish)

 
 
Argentine diaspora
Hispanic and Latino American